(born 20 April 1940 in Tokyo, Japan) was one of the last live-in students (uchideshi) of the founder of aikido, Morihei Ueshiba. He entered the Aikikai Hombu Dojo in 1956 and after a year as a regular aikido student was accepted as an uchideshi by Ueshiba and went with him to live, work and train at the Iwama dojo. He received his 3rd dan (sandan) directly from Ueshiba and served him as his assistant/attendant, scribe, uke, and assisted in instructing when people came from Tokyo to Iwama to study aikido.

On 10 October 1979, Kurita was given a Shihan license by Doshu Kisshomaru Ueshiba and the Aikikai Foundation and dispatched to Mexico City to be the official Aikikai representative for Mexico. He currently holds the rank of 7th dan.

Kurita has devoted the last 30 years to working, developing and teaching what he learned during his time as an uchideshi, the current work and result being Kurita Juku Aiki, in and of which there are dojo and members in Mexico, the United States, France, and Argentina.

Kurita Juku Aiki - Aikido in Mexico
After taking a hiatus from Aikido for 9 years after the death of Ueshiba, in 1978, Kurita was urged to come back to aikido by his fellow uchideshi Mitsunari Kanai and Kazuo Chiba (Birankai). He was sent to the United States and then directed to Mexico City by Yoshimitsu Yamada (New York Aikikai).

He arrived in Mexico City on 14 May 1979. In 1980, the Asociacion Mexicana de Aikido was formed, and from 1989 to 1999 held annual international seminars with guests Mitsunari Kanai, Yoshimitsu Yamada, Ichiro Shibata, Kazuo Chiba, T.S Okuyama, and M. Murishige.

In 1999, Kurita Juku Aiki was started in order to take Aikido one step further in its development by rescuing all the original teachings of the Founder of Aikido, Morihei Ueshiba. The Central Dojo is in Mexico City and is devoted not only to transmit the teaching of Aiki in its purest form but to develop a theory that will launch it to a better understanding apart from all the martial references that had made it similar to old martial arts. Kurita Juku Aiki works with students from other parts of Mexico and with seminars in both Mexico and the United States, as well as with Aikikai Hombu Dojo and the United States Aikido Federation.

Kurita Juku Aiki - Aikido in the United States
In 1995 the first schools derived by Kurita Shihan outside of Mexico were formed in the United States, and over the years there are KJA dojo and classes in Texas, in: San Antonio, Laredo, San Marcos, New Braunfels and Wimberley.

References

External links
Kurita Juku Aiki

1940 births
Living people
Japanese aikidoka